Yevgeniy Vladimirov (born 20 January 1957) is a chess player and trainer from Kazakhstan. He was awarded the title of Grandmaster by FIDE in 1989.

Career
In 2004, during the 14th Abu Dhabi Chess Festival, Vladimirov played a match against the computer program Hydra, losing three games and drawing one.

He acted as one of Garry Kasparov's s in his 1986 World Championship match against Anatoly Karpov, when he was accused by Kasparov of giving information about the former's preparation to Karpov. In 2004 he was awarded the title of FIDE Senior Trainer. In 2014, at the 1st Annual Asian Chess Excellence Awards in Al Ain, Vladimirov was voted the best coach of the year.

References

External links
 
 
 

1957 births
Living people
Chess grandmasters
Chess coaches
Soviet chess players
Kazakhstani chess players
Chess players at the 2010 Asian Games
Asian Games competitors for Kazakhstan
Sportspeople from Almaty